Expedition after Forrest was a military movement of the Union Army during the American Civil War.

Expedition
Major General Nathan Bedford Forrest of the Confederate States Army was making raids in west Tennessee, his force giving Union commanders headaches on their supply lines Major General William T. Sherman order his Memphis commanders to catch him on December 24 an expedition began to cut off Forrest's retreat to Mississippi. The Union force set out marching an average of twenty miles a day with many skirmishes with Forrest. Nonetheless, General Forrest still managed to escape across the Tennessee River to end the expedition On December 31, 1863.

Result
Major General Forrest escaped capture from the Union forces, carried off one hundred wagons, two hundred beef cattle, three thousand conscripts and innumerable stores, torn up railroad track, cut telegraph wire, and burned and sacked towns.

References

Expeditions of the American Civil War
1863 in Tennessee
Military operations of the American Civil War in Tennessee